Ransom is a 1996 American action thriller film directed by Ron Howard from a screenplay by Richard Price and Alexander Ignon. The film stars Mel Gibson, Rene Russo, Gary Sinise, Delroy Lindo, Lili Taylor, Brawley Nolte, Liev Schreiber, Donnie Wahlberg and Evan Handler. Gibson was nominated for a Golden Globe Award for Best Actor. The film was the 5th highest-grossing film of 1996 in the United States. The original story came from a 1954 episode of The United States Steel Hour titled "Fearful Decision". In 1956, it was adapted by Cyril Hume and Richard Maibaum into the feature film, Ransom!, starring Glenn Ford, Donna Reed, and Leslie Nielsen.

Plot
While multi-billionaire Tom Mullen and his wife Kate attend a science fair, their son Sean is kidnapped. Sean is taken to an apartment by Maris Conner, a caterer working for the Mullens, along with brothers Clark and Cubby Barnes, as well as tech expert Miles Roberts. NYPD Detective Jimmy Shaker is Maris' boyfriend and the mastermind behind the kidnapping. The kidnappers send Tom and Kate an e-mail demanding $2 million. Tom calls the FBI, who begin operating from his New York City penthouse under Special Agent Lonnie Hawkins. In private, Tom voices his belief that a union machinist, Jackie Brown, who is in prison following one of Tom's business scandals, may be behind it. They visit Brown in prison, but he denies any involvement.

Tom agrees to the FBI's plan for delivering the ransom. Receiving a phone call from Shaker, who electronically disguises his voice, Tom follows his instructions. He meets Cubby in a New Jersey quarry but refuses to hand over the money when Cubby fails to give him Shaker's promised directions. A fight ensues and the FBI intervene and shoot Cubby, who dies before revealing Sean's location; Tom begins to realize there is no guarantee Sean will be returned alive. Shaker later arranges another drop off, but although Tom initially agrees to take the money alone at first, he instead appears on television and offers the ransom as a bounty on the kidnappers, promising to withdraw the bounty and drop all charges if the kidnappers return Sean alive and unharmed.

Despite Kate and Agent Hawkins' pleadings, Tom sticks to his plan, believing it is the best chance for Sean's return. Shaker lures Kate to a meeting where he assaults her and presents Sean's blood-stained t-shirt as a warning to pay the ransom or Sean will die, but Tom responds by doubling the bounty to $4 million. Shaker calls Tom and gives him one final warning to pay the ransom, but Tom still refuses, and Shaker fires a gunshot after Tom hears Sean scream for help, leading Tom and Kate to believe Sean is dead. Clark and Miles attempt to abandon the plan and flee, but Shaker calls in the NYPD to request backup and kills both Clark and Miles while making it look like Miles shot first and kills Maris after she shoots him in the arm from behind. The NYPD arrive and find Shaker with a badly beaten Sean, believing Shaker found and rescued Sean. Hawkins informs Tom and Kate, and they are reunited with Sean while Shaker is hospitalized.

Shaker arrives at Tom's penthouse to claim the reward. He intends to immediately leave the country before his connection to Maris is discovered. Sean, however, recognizes Shaker's voice as the kidnapper, causing Tom to notice his son's frightened reaction. Realizing his cover is blown, Shaker plans to kill everyone in the apartment, but Tom persuades him to accompany him to the bank to gain the money and leave peacefully. Shaker attempts to force Tom to wire the money from the house via phone, but Tom stands his ground and warns him that whether he receives his money or not, Shaker will be exposed and hunted citywide. Shaker reluctantly agrees to go to the bank, threatening to rekidnap and execute Sean should Tom attempt any double-crossing. On the way, however, Tom discreetly alerts Hawkins, and the police and FBI converge on Tom and Shaker outside the bank. As soon as Tom and Shaker exit the bank, two police officers attempt to detain Shaker, but Shaker shoots them. Tom knocks Shaker to the ground and the two struggle. Tom picks up Shaker's dropped gun and points at him. Hawkins and other police officers demand that Tom drop the gun and walk away. In desperation, Shaker draws another gun, but is shot dead by Tom and Hawkins. Tom finally drops the gun and police rush in to arrest Tom, but Hawkins orders them to stand down, and Tom leaves the scene with Kate.

Cast
 Mel Gibson as Tom Mullen
 Rene Russo as Kate Mullen
 Brawley Nolte as Sean Mullen
 Gary Sinise as Detective Jimmy Shaker
 Delroy Lindo as FBI Special Agent Lonnie Hawkins
 Lili Taylor as Maris Conner
 Liev Schreiber as Clark Barnes
 Donnie Wahlberg as 'Cubby' Barnes
 Evan Handler as Miles Roberts
 Paul Guilfoyle as FBI Director Stan Wallace
 José Zúñiga as David Torres
 Dan Hedaya as Jackie Brown
 John Ortiz as Roberto
 David Vadim as an NYPD Officer

Reception
Ransom has a 74% rating from Rotten Tomatoes based on 74 reviews, with its consensus stating: "Directed with propulsive intensity by Ron Howard, Ransom is a fiery thriller packed with hot-blooded performances and jolting twists." Metacritic gave the film a score of 60 based on 21 reviews, indicating "mixed or average reviews". Audiences polled by CinemaScore gave the film an average grade of "A−" on an A+ to F scale.

Critic Roger Ebert gave the film three stars out of four and wrote, "Gibson gives an interesting performance, showing a man trying to think his way out of a crisis, and Sinise makes a good foil: Here are two smart men playing a game with deadly stakes."

Awards and nominations
1997 ASCAP Film and Television Music Awards
 Won - Top Box Office Film
1997 Academy of Science Fiction, Fantasy & Horror Films (Saturn Awards)
 Nominated - Best Action/Adventure/Thriller Film
1997 Golden Globe Awards
 Nominated - Best Actor - Motion Picture Drama — Mel Gibson
1997 Image Awards
 Nominated - Outstanding Supporting Actor in a Motion Picture — Delroy Lindo
1997 Young Artist Awards
 Nominated - Best Performance in a Feature Film - Supporting Young Actor — Brawley Nolte

References

External links

 
 
 
 
 

1996 films
1996 crime thriller films
1990s thriller drama films
American crime thriller films
American thriller drama films
Remakes of American films
Films about child abduction in the United States
Films about extortion
Films about families
Films about terrorism in the United States
Films directed by Ron Howard
Films produced by Brian Grazer
Films produced by Scott Rudin
Films scored by James Horner
Films set in New York City
Films shot in New Jersey
Films shot in New York City
Films about hostage takings
Imagine Entertainment films
Films with screenplays by Richard Price (writer)
Touchstone Pictures films
Films with screenplays by Richard Maibaum
Films about father–son relationships
1990s English-language films
1990s American films